Dennis Marvin Seidenberg (born 18 July 1981) is a German former professional ice hockey defenceman who played in the National Hockey League (NHL) for the Philadelphia Flyers, Phoenix Coyotes, Carolina Hurricanes, Florida Panthers, New York Islanders, and Boston Bruins, with whom he won the Stanley Cup in 2011. His younger brother Yannic plays for EHC Red Bull München in the DEL.

Playing career
As a youth, Seidenberg played in the 1994 and 1995 Quebec International Pee-Wee Hockey Tournaments with a team from Baden-Württemberg.

Philadelphia Flyers
Seidenberg was drafted in the sixth round, 172nd overall, by the Philadelphia Flyers in the 2001 NHL Entry Draft. After spending three years with Adler Mannheim of the Deutsche Eishockey Liga (DEL) in his native Germany, he signed with the Flyers in 2002. Seidenberg spent the next two seasons bouncing between the NHL team and the American Hockey League (AHL)'s Philadelphia Phantoms, but played the entire 2004–05 season with the Phantoms during the lockout, winning the 2005 Calder Cup.

Phoenix Coyotes/Carolina Hurricanes
In both seasons after the lockout, Seidenberg was involved in a mid-season trade. On 20 January 2006, Seidenberg was sent to the Phoenix Coyotes for Petr Nedvěd; the following year, the Coyotes sent Seidenberg to the Carolina Hurricanes on 8 January in exchange for center Kevyn Adams.

Florida Panthers
On 14 September 2009, he signed a one-year $2.25 million contract with the Florida Panthers.

Boston Bruins

On 3 March 2010, Seidenberg and Matt Bartkowski were traded to the Boston Bruins for Byron Bitz, Craig Weller, and a second round draft pick. In June 2010, Seidenberg was re-signed by Boston to a four-year contract worth $13 million.

In 2010–11, Seidenberg had a career-high 32 points during the regular season. He then had 11 points in the playoffs to help the Bruins win the Stanley Cup. Seidenberg drew attention for his outstanding play during the playoffs, at one point being cited as a potential Conn Smythe Trophy winner. He is the second German-born player to win the Stanley Cup, following his favorite player growing up, Uwe Krupp.

During a 27 December 2013 away game against the Ottawa Senators, Seidenberg was taken down by an Ottawa skater that resulted with Seidenberg's ACL and MCL knee ligaments being injured, ending his play for the season with 6 to 8 months away from hockey following surgery to repair the ligaments.

On 2 March 2016, he had been selected for the 2016 World Cup of Hockey where he represented Team Europe.

At the conclusion of the 2015–16 season, Seidenberg's seven-year tenure with the Bruins ended, as he was bought out from the remaining two years of his contract on 30 June 2016.

New York Islanders
On 28 September 2016, Seidenberg signed a one-year contract with the New York Islanders. He signed a new one-year deal with the team on 24 April 2017.

After going most of the season unsigned, Seidenberg re-signed with the Islanders on a reported one-year, $700,000 contract on 26 February 2019. However, he did not play for the Islanders during the season. He announced his retirement on 23 October 2019.

Career statistics

Regular season and playoffs

International

Awards and honors

References

External links
 

1981 births
Adler Mannheim players
Boston Bruins players
Carolina Hurricanes players
Florida Panthers players
German ice hockey defencemen
Ice hockey players at the 2002 Winter Olympics
Ice hockey players at the 2006 Winter Olympics
Ice hockey players at the 2010 Winter Olympics
Living people
New York Islanders players
Olympic ice hockey players of Germany
People from Villingen-Schwenningen
Sportspeople from Freiburg (region)
Philadelphia Flyers draft picks
Philadelphia Flyers players
Philadelphia Phantoms players
Phoenix Coyotes players
Stanley Cup champions
German expatriate ice hockey people
Expatriate ice hockey players in the United States
German expatriate sportspeople in the United States